Peter Squires may refer to:
 Peter Squires (sportsman), English cricketer and rugby union player
 Peter Squires (diver), English diver
 Peter J. M. Squires, Royal Air Force officer

See also
 Peter Squire, Royal Air Force officer